Zoubin Ghahramani FRS (born 8 February 1970) is a British-Iranian researcher and Professor of Information Engineering at the University of Cambridge. He holds joint appointments at University College London and the Alan Turing Institute. and has been a Fellow of St John's College, Cambridge since 2009. He was Associate Research Professor at Carnegie Mellon University School of Computer Science from 2003–2012. He was also the Chief Scientist of Uber from 2016 until 2020. He joined Google Brain in 2020 as senior research director. He is also Deputy Director of the Leverhulme Centre for the Future of Intelligence.

Education
Ghahramani was educated at the American School of Madrid in Spain and the University of Pennsylvania where he was awarded a double major degree in Cognitive Science and Computer Science in 1990. He obtained his Ph.D. from the Department of Brain and Cognitive Sciences at the Massachusetts Institute of Technology, supervised by Michael I. Jordan and Tomaso Poggio.

Research and career
Following his Ph.D., Ghahramani moved to the University of Toronto in 1995 as a Postdoctoral Fellow in the Artificial Intelligence Lab, working with Geoffrey Hinton. From 1998 to 2005, he was a member of the faculty at the Gatsby Computational Neuroscience Unit, University College London.

Ghahramani has made significant contributions in the areas of Bayesian machine learning (particularly variational methods for approximate Bayesian inference), as well as graphical models and computational neuroscience. His current research focuses on nonparametric Bayesian modelling and statistical machine learning. He has also worked on artificial intelligence, information retrieval, bioinformatics and statistics which provide the mathematical foundations for handling uncertainty, making decisions, and designing learning systems. He has published over 200 papers, receiving over 80,000 citations (an h-index of 120).

He co-founded Geometric Intelligence in 2014, with Gary Marcus, Doug Bemis, and Ken Stanley, which was acquired by Uber in 2016. Afterwards, he transferred to Uber's AI Labs in 2016, and later became Chief Scientist at Uber, replacing Gary Marcus. In 2020 he joined Google and became the Sr. Director of Google Brain in April 2021 after Samy Bengio's departure.

Awards and honors
Ghahramani was elected Fellow of the Royal Society (FRS) in 2015. His certificate of election reads:

He was awarded the Royal Society Milner Award in 2021 in recognition of ‘his fundamental contributions to probabilistic machine learning’.

References

External links
 

1970 births
Machine learning researchers
Artificial intelligence researchers
Living people
Members of the University of Cambridge Department of Engineering
British people of Iranian descent
Iranian engineers
Carnegie Mellon University faculty
Academics of University College London
Massachusetts Institute of Technology School of Science alumni
Fellows of St John's College, Cambridge
Fellows of the Royal Society
Uber people
Engineering professors at the University of Cambridge